Rahata is a city and a municipal council in Ahmadnagar district in the Indian state of Maharashtra.

Demographics
As of the 2001 Indian census, there were 19,024 people residing in Rahata. Males constituted 51% of the population, with the remaining 49% being females. Rahta Pimplas has an average literacy rate of 72%, higher than the national average of 59.5%: male literacy is 79%, and female literacy is 65%.  In Rahta Pimplas, 13% of the population is under 6 years of age.

Location
Rahata city is located on the Nagar-Manmad road, just 5 km from holy place Shirdi and Bhagwatimata (3 1/2 Shaktipeth) temple at Bhagwatipur Kolhar 20 km from Shirdi.
And Famous for agriculture implements one of the most Showroom famous in Rahta. Temple of Lord Virbhadra is famous for its fair. Village close to this town in Sakuri, known for Shri. Upasani Maharaj and Sati. Godavari Mata holy place where they lived.

References

Ahmednagar district
Villages in Ahmednagar district